The Iranian National Museum of Medical Sciences History is the first medical museum established in Iran by a joint project between the Iranian Cultural Heritage Organization, the Iranian Ministry of Health and Medical Education, Iranian Academy of Medical Sciences, and Tehran University of Medical Sciences.

History 
In the spring of 1997 and during a meeting in the presence of Dr. Mohammad Frahadi (the former Minister of Health and Medical Education), Dr. Eiraj Fazel (the former head of the Iranian Academy of Medical Sciences), Sayyed Mohammad Beheshti (the former head of the Iranian Cultural Heritage Organization) and Dr. Mohammad Reza Zafarqandi (the former head of Tehran University of Medical Sciences) and many other officials, Dr. Maziar Ashrafian Bonab was appointed head of the project and the museum.

During the first two years of the project, a historic building which dates back to the late Qajar era and located in North Amir Abad (Tehran) was allocated and prepared for this museum. At the same time, several scientific research were performed by groups of researchers and scientists under the supervision of Dr. Maziar Ashrafian Bonab, to find, locate and collect all objects, documents, manuscripts and even art works related to the medical history of the country.

The museum was Inaugurated in September 2002 by Dr. Mohammad Farhadi, Dr. Mohammad-Reza Zafarqandi and Sayyed Mohammad Beheshti and Dr. Maziar Ashrafian Bonab. Since 2002 Dr. Shams Shariate Torbaqan has been the head of the museum.

Description 
The museum is jointly operated by ICHO and the Tehran University of Medical Sciences.

The building of the museum, and is located in Amir Abad in Tehran. The National Museum of Medical Sciences History has the following sections:

Ancient and historic tools used in medicine
 Manuscripts and medical documents
 Iran’s famous physicians
 History of nursing and midwifery in Iran
 History of veterinary medicine in Iran
 History of dentistry in Iran
 Herbal medicine
 Traditional medicine
 Embryology
The goals of the museum are as the following:

 Developing and organizing research activities to introduce the valuable heritage of the great masters of medicine to the present and future generations, and to promote the public culture, and furnish a clear picture of the glorious past of medicine in Iran.
 Discovering, studying, collecting, repairing, and maintaining works, tools, devices, and documents related to medicine from the ancient times to the present day, and their presentation to encourage research, and study.

Outstanding artefacts 

 5000-BC skull of a 13-year-old girl

References

External links 
 
 Photo Gallery of National History Museum of Medical Sciences History of IRAN

Museums in Tehran
University of Tehran
Medical museums
Medical and health organisations based in Iran